Fuchs is German and Yiddish for 'fox' and may refer to:

People 
 Fuchs (surname)

Education 
 Fuchs Mizrachi School, a Modern Orthodox Jewish college preparatory day school located in Beachwood, Ohio.

Geography 
 Fuchs, California

Industry 
 Fuchs Petrolub, the world's largest independent manufacturer of lubricants, and related speciality products.
 Fuchs Group, spice company based in Germany
 Fuchs Systems Inc., a German manufacturer of equipment for making steel

Medicine 
 Fuchs' dystrophy, a slowly progressing corneal disease

Military 
 Transportpanzer Fuchs, a German armoured personnel carrier

See also 
 
 Fox (disambiguation)
 Fux